Abderamane Mbaindiguim (born March 1, 1982) is a Chadian professional basketball player.  He currently plays for the CSM Constantine Sports Club of the Algerian Basketball Championship. Mbaindiguim is one of Chad's most prominent basketball figures. 

He played most minutes and scored most points for the Chad national basketball team at the 2011 FIBA Africa Championship in Antananarivo, Madagascar.

Career overview
Abderamane Mbaindiguim played professional basketball for the following teams:
 2010–present CSM Constantine

References

External links
FIBA Profile
Afrobasket.com Profile

1982 births
Living people
Chadian men's basketball players
People from N'Djamena
Small forwards